RICC may refer to:

 Rhode Island Comic Con
 Rhode Island Convention Center
 Rhode Island Country Club 
 Rhode Island Children's Chorus